Wèi Huán-zĭ (died 446 BCE), also known as Wèi Xuān-zi, was a leader of the State of Wei during the Warring States period of Chinese history. Personal name Jū (駒/驹), he was the son of Wèi Xiāng-zǐ.

When Wèi Xiāng-zǐ died, Wèi Huán-zĭ succeeded him as leader of Wei. Together with Zhào Xiāng-zĭ and Hán Kāng-zĭ, Wèi Huán-zĭ defeated Zhì Bóyáo of the State of Zhi. Afterwards the three allies divided up the Zhi territory and expanded their own state borders making them larger than the other vassal states.

After Wèi Huán-zĭ died, his son Marquess Wen of Wei became the Wei leader.

Monarchs of Wei (state)
Zhou dynasty people